Introducing is the debut extended play by Swedish singer Zara Larsson. The EP was released on 21 January 2013, by TEN Music Group and Universal Music Group. The first and only single from the album, "Uncover", was released on 21 January 2013. "Uncover" went on to be a success, topping the charts in Sweden and Norway along with becoming certified 6× Platinum in Sweden and Platinum in Norway.

Commercial performance 
Although the album itself did not chart on any charts, its songs did well. Besides "Uncover" being an enormous hit, other songs on the EP including "Under My Shades", "When Worlds Collide", and "It's a Wrap", peaked at number 45, number 26, and number 43, respectively.

Track listing

References 

Zara Larsson albums
2013 EPs